Michael David Casale (born October 25, 1978) is a former American soccer player who played one season with Seattle Sounders in the USL A-League.

References

External links
Washington Huskies bio

1978 births
Living people
American soccer players
Washington Huskies men's soccer players
Seattle Sounders Select players
Seattle Sounders (1994–2008) players
Association football defenders
Soccer players from New Mexico
USL League Two players
A-League (1995–2004) players